Chakthip Chaijinda (born 19 October 1959) is a former Commissioner-General of the Royal Thai Police from 2015 to 2020.

Educations
Chakthip graduated from Vajiravudh College, and then he graduated from Armed Forces Academies Preparatory School in Class 20, same class with current King Vajiralongkorn man, Apirat Kongsompong. After graduated from AFAPS he studied at the Royal Thai Police Cadet Academy and an additional investigation course in international post-blast investigations at the International Law Enforcement Academy of Bangkok (ATF-ILEA), and then took courses at the FBI Academy in Quantico, Virginia. He passed the Counter Assault Team course of the United States Secret Service. He attended the anti-terror course of the Naresuan 261 Counter-Terrorism Unit and Arintharat 26.

Career
Following the military coup of 22 May 2014, Chakthip was appointed to the National Legislative Assembly (NLA).

The National Police Policy Committee, on 14 August 2015, promoted Chakthip to be the eleventh Commissioner-General of the Royal Thai Police, replacing Pol. Gen. Somyot Poompanmoung who retired on 30 September 2015.

In the Nakhon Ratchasima shootings of February 2020, Chakthip led the SWAT team.

Chakthip was retired on 30 September 2020, making him one of the longest-serving Royal Thai Police Commissioners-General. Chakthip was succeeded by Suwat Jangyodsuk in 2020.

Personal life
Chaktip, together with his spouse, declared assets of 865 million baht in his 2014 asset declaration.

Awards
  The Most Exalted Order of the White Elephant

References

1959 births
Living people
Chakthip Chaijinda
Chakthip Chaijinda
Chakthip Chaijinda
Chakthip Chaijinda